Mirka is a Palestinian village.

Mirka may also refer to

Mirka (film), a 2000 drama 
Mirka (name), a feminine given name
Mirka-class frigate of the Soviet Navy